Narges Marz (also known as Narges Marzeh and Narges Marzeh-ye Bālā) is a village in Dabuy-ye Jonubi Rural District, Dabudasht District, Amol County, Mazandaran Province, Iran. At the 2006 census, its population was 290, in 77 families.

References 

Populated places in Amol County